GA4 may refer to:
 Georgia's 4th congressional district, a congressional district in the U.S. state of Georgia
 Georgia State Route 4, a state highway in the eastern part of the state
 U.S. Route 1 in Georgia, a US highway that is mostly concurrent in the state with SR 4
 Gibberellin A4, a form of the gibberellin plant hormone
 Google Analytics' fourth generation, released in 2020